Baranauskas is the masculine form of a Lithuanian family name. Its feminine forms  are: Baranauskienė (married woman or widow) and Baranauskaitė (unmarried woman).

The surname may refer to:

Antanas Baranauskas (1835–1902), Lithuanian poet and bishop
Tomas Baranauskas (born 1973), Lithuanian historian
Stasys Baranauskas (born 1962), Lithuanian football player

See also
Baranowski, Polish version
Baranovsky, Russian version

Lithuanian-language surnames